The bill to amend the Act of March 1, 1933, to transfer certain authority and resources to the Utah Dineh Corporation., and for other purposes. This bill was introduced on the Senate floor by Rep. Robert Bennett (R-UT) on 21 September 2009.  It was referred to the Committee on Indian Affairs. On December 9, 2009 Senate Committee on Indian Affairs held hearing 111-538.  No further action was taken by the Committee.

Background
During the 2008 General Session of the Utah Legislature, House Bill 352 was passed which recognized the repeal of the Utah Navajo Trust Fund.

The bill moved responsibility to fulfill the liabilities and obligations of the repealed Utah Navajo Trust Fund to the Department of Administrative Services and provided for a transition process until Congress designates a new recipient of Utah Navajo royalties.

Official Summary 
A BILL

To amend the Act of March 1, 1933, to transfer certain authority and resources to the Utah Dineh Corporation., and for other purposes.

Be it enacted by the Senate and House of Representatives of the United States of America in Congress assembled,

SECTION 1. TRANSFER OF AUTHORITY AND RESOURCES TO UTAH DINEH CORPORATION.

(a) Amendment- The Act of March 1, 1933 (47 Stat. 1418; 82 Stat. 121; 90 Stat. 2788), is amended--

(1) in the first section--

(A) by striking `thereon: Should' and inserting `thereon. Should'; and

(B) by striking `State of Utah: Provided, That said' and all that follows through the end of the section and inserting the following: `Utah Dineh Corporation: Provided, That 37.5 percent of those royalties shall be paid to the Utah Dineh Corporation to promote the educational, health, economic, social, and cultural well-being of all Navajo Indians residing in San Juan County, Utah. Provided further, That the Utah Dineh Corporation shall submit to the Secretary of the Interior annual reports describing the accounts and operations of the Corporation concerning the funds received under this section.'; and

(2) in section 2, by striking `equal in area and'.

(b) Transfer of Funds and Property-

(1) IN GENERAL- Except as provided in paragraph (2), not later than March 31, 2010, the State of Utah shall transfer to the Utah Dineh Corporation--

(A) all funds, assets, and real property (including appurtenances) held by the State in trust for the San Juan Navajo Indians pursuant to the Act of March 1, 1933 (47 Stat. 1418; 82 Stat. 121; 90 Stat. 2788), on the day before the date of enactment of this Act, for use by the Corporation in accordance with the Act of March 1, 1933 (as amended by subsection (a)); and

(B) all contracts and obligations entered into by the State, acting in the capacity of the State as trustee, on behalf of the San Juan Navajo Indians, in accordance with the Act of March 1, 1933 (47 Stat. 1418; 82 Stat. 121; 90 Stat. 2788), that are outstanding on the day before the date of enactment of this Act.

(2) EXTENSION- The State of Utah and the Utah Dineh Corporation, by mutual agreement and on publication for a period of not less than 14 days in a newspaper of general circulation, may extend the deadline for the transfer described in paragraph (1) as the State and Corporation determine to be appropriate.

(c) Effect of Section-

(1) RIGHTS AND REMEDIES- Nothing in the amendments made by subsection (a) alters any legal right or remedy that accrued before the date of enactment of this Act.

(2) PRIOR ACTS- Nothing in this section or the amendments made by this section imposes any liability on the Utah Dineh Corporation for any act that occurred before the date of enactment of this Act.

Define Terms 
9/21/2009—Introduced.Directs Utah, by March 31, 2010, to transfer to the Utah Dineh Corporation:

(1) all funds, assets, and real property held in trust for the San Juan Navajo Indians pursuant to the Act of March 1, 1933; and

(2) all outstanding contracts and obligations entered into by Utah acting as trustee on behalf of the San Juan Navajo Indians in accordance with such Act. Authorizes the extension of such transfer as agreed upon by both parties. Transfers from Utah to the Corporation the payment of specified royalties to promote the educational, health, economic, social, and cultural well-being of all Navajo Indians residing in San Juan County, Utah.

Advocates 
Senator Robert Bennett (R-UT)

Commissioner Kenneth Maryboy

Council Delegate Davis Filfred

Commissioner-Elect Phil Lyman

Council Delegate (Ret.) Mark Maryboy

Opponents 
Navajo Vice-President Ben Shelly

Navajos calling themselves Descendants of K'aayelii

Aneth Chapter President John Billie

Reaction 
US Senator Robert Bennett's position was sympathetic to The Navajos residing in San Juan County since they are his constituents.

According to him, in 2008 he had received resolutions from six of the seven Utah Navajo Chapters (the seventh chapter has fewer than fifty members residing in Utah) endorsing the idea of designating a new trustee as long as that trustee is not the Navajo Nation. The response to his question of why the Utah Navajo did not want the Navajo Nation to serve as trustee was that they believe the Navajo Nation will use the Utah Navajo Trust Fund for purposes other than what the 1933 Act and 1968 amendments require.

Senator Bennett went on the state that, "I represent their interests as Utahns in the United States Senate and share their desire to grant them the ability to determine their own future, I agreed to work with them in resolving this problem."

Local Reaction
The Senate Committee on Indian Affairs heard testimony December 9, 2010 on the proposed amendment. Kenneth Maryboy, a Navajo Nation Council delegate representing Utah Navajos, testified that the Navajo Nation has previously "failed to be a competent trustee for Utah Navajos, Congress must not now abandon Utah Navajos by ignoring the history of neglect, unaccountability and malfeasance that the Navajo Nation continues to demonstrate," said Maryboy, a member of the Board of Directors of the Utah Dineh Corporation.

According to San Juan County Commissioner-Elect Phil Lymann, he has stated that "This is an important bill for the Utah Navajos. Utah Dineh Corporation is a well established entity with tremendous potential for effectively developing one of the most underserved areas of the United States. By returning control of this asset to its owners, the Utah Navajos, Senator Bennett will effectively restore hope for real economic development on the Utah Strip of the Navajo Reservation. 
100 years of handouts, coupled with tribal, state, and federal politics has certainly not done the job."

Navajo Nation Reaction

The Vice President Ben Shelly testified that the Navajo Nation rightfully should be the trust fund trustee. He said the Navajo Nation is adamantly opposed to Senate Bill 1690.

Vice President Shelly told the committee that the Navajo Nation would be an accountable, responsible, and transparent trustee in the Utah Navajo Trust Fund. He said "that in the 30 years of administrating the current Utah Navajo Trust Fund, the Navajo Nation has never breached its fiduciary responsibility to the trust fund."

See also
 United States Senate
 Utah Dineh Corporation
 Navajo Nation
 Navajo people

References

External links
 http://www.museumstuff.com/learn/topics/Senate_Bill_1690

San Juan County, Utah
Proposed legislation of the 111th United States Congress